Joăo Evangelista Martins Terra, S.J. (7 March 1925 – 11 March 2022) was a Brazilian Roman Catholic bishop.

Born in Brazil, Martins Terra was ordained to the priesthood in 1956 for the Society of Jesus. He was appointed titular bishop of Bagis and then served as the auxiliary bishop of the Roman Catholic Archdiocese of Olinda and Recife, Brazil, from 1988 to 1994 and as the auxiliary bishop of the Roman Catholic Archdiocese of Brasilia, Brazil, from 1994 until his retirement in 2004. Martins Terra died on 11 March 2022, four days after his 97th birthday.

References

1925 births
2022 deaths
20th-century Roman Catholic bishops in Brazil
21st-century Roman Catholic bishops in Brazil
Jesuit bishops
20th-century Brazilian Jesuits
People from São Paulo (state)